A Posteriori is the sixth studio album by German musical project Enigma, released on 22 September 2006 by Virgin Records. In December 2006, the album was nominated for Best New Age Album at the 2007 Grammy Awards.

While the previous album, Voyageur, contained minimal amounts of the project's signature sounds, A Posteriori only contains the signature "Enigma horn" (a foghorn) during the opening minute of the album, and even then it is a fleeting glimpse. Coupled with the album's subject matter of the collision of the Milky Way and Andromeda galaxies, A Posteriori is, compared to earlier releases, stark and foreboding.

Background
News about the album's title and track list were first made public on 18 July 2006 through the Crocodile-Music.de website and EnigmaMusic.com's forums, while the album cover was made public ten days later. The first track to be made public was "Hello and Welcome", released as a standalone single in 2006. Enigma's management subsequently stated that a new version would be included on the record, while the lead single off the album proper would be "Goodbye Milky Way".

Recording
A Posteriori became the first Enigma album to be recorded using Michael Cretu's new 5.1 fully computerized mobile music studio, "Alchemist", a machine of relatively small size with a main keyboard and a number of hardware MIDI controllers with some "special" expansions and a central computer with LCD screen. The device was designed for Cretu privately.

Etymology
"A posteriori", a Latin phrase translated as "after the fact", refers to empirical knowledge, the epistemological concept of deriving knowledge from past experience.

"Eppur si muove", alternately spelled "E pur si muove!", is an Italian phrase translated to "And yet it moves", attributed to Galileo Galilei after he was sentenced by the Roman Inquisition to recant his belief in heliocentrism.

Reception

Thom Jurek of AllMusic wrote, "[I]f you like the Enigma sound, this will be up your alley, full of the things you may seek out in a recording, but there is little new here."

Track listing
All songs written, arranged, and produced by Michael Cretu.

Credits
Enigma
 Michael Cretu – music, lyrics, vocals (tracks 6, 10, 12), performance, production, programming, engineering

Additional musicians
 Narration – Louisa Stanley (tracks 4, 12)
 Voice – Andru Donalds (track 8)

Apart from the album, some additional remixes were released exclusively through the iTunes Store. They are:
 "Eppur si muove" (Tocadisco Remix) – 6:39
 "Dreaming of Andromeda" (Jean F. Cochois Remix) – 7:28
 "20.000 Miles over the Sea" (Boca Junior Remix) – 7:07
 "The Alchemist" (The Alchemist's Vision by Ralf Hildenbeutel) – 7:17

A Posteriori Private Lounge Remix
The Private Lounge Remix album version of A Posteriori was released via iTunes on 18 March 2007 in Germany and on 26 March in the rest of Europe.

Charts

Weekly charts

Year-end charts

Certifications

Release history

References

2006 albums
Albums produced by Michael Cretu
Concept albums
Enigma (German band) albums
Virgin Records albums